The Infirmary, now  known as the Student Health Care Center, is a historic building on the campus of the University of Florida in Gainesville, Florida in the United States. It was designed by Rudolph Weaver in the Collegiate Gothic style and was built in 1931. Since 1983, it has served as a student outpatient clinic.

The Infirmary is a contributing property in the University of Florida Campus Historic District. On April 20, 1989, it was added to the National Register of Historic Places.

Accreditation
The center was successfully granted its latest three-year Accreditation Association for Ambulatory Health Care (AAAHC) accreditation term (May 31, 2014 through May 30, 2017) on April 21, 2014.

While more than 5,000 ambulatory health care organizations across the U.S. are accredited by the AAAHC, just 220 of those accredited are college health services. The center was first accredited in 1984 by The Joint Commission, later changing to AAAHC accreditation to better match the facility and its services.

See also
University of Florida
Buildings at the University of Florida
Campus Historic District

References

External links
  UF Historic Sites Guide: Infirmary

Buildings at the University of Florida
National Register of Historic Places in Gainesville, Florida
Rudolph Weaver buildings
Historic district contributing properties in Florida
University and college buildings on the National Register of Historic Places in Florida
1931 establishments in Florida
University and college buildings completed in 1931